Var Posht Rural District is a rural district (dehestan) in the Central District of Tiran and Karvan County, Isfahan Province, Iran. At the 2006 census, its population was 9,299, in 2,541 families.  The rural district has 9 villages.

References 

Rural Districts of Isfahan Province
Tiran and Karvan County